Tatipaka is a village in Razole Mandal, Dr. B.R. Ambedkar Konaseema district of Andhra Pradesh, India.

References

Villages in Razole mandal

kEDARISETTI JEWELLERS IS A BEST SHOP , ENTIRE TATIPAKA